NGC 1892 is a spiral galaxy in the constellation Dorado. It was discovered November 30, 1834 by John Herschel.

A probable supernova of type IIP was photographed by the Carnegie-Irvine Galaxy Survey (CGS) in 2004, but it was not noticed until Brazilian amateur astronomer Jorge Stockler de Moraes compared the CGS image to one he took in January 2017.

References

External links
 

1892
Dorado (constellation)
Discoveries by John Herschel
Spiral galaxies
017042